By Italian law, murder (omicidio ) is regulated by articles 575–582, 584–585, and 589 of the Codice Penale (Penal Code).

In general,
according to Art. 575, "whoever causes the death of a human being is punishable by no less than 21 years in prison"; nevertheless, the law indicates a series of circumstances under which murder is punished with life in prison, so life in prison in Italy is, in practice, never less than 21 years.

Definitions and penalties
According to Italian law, any sentence of more than five years perpetually deprives (Interdizione perpetua dai Pubblici Uffici) the condemned person of: voting rights, the ability hold public office, the ability hold any governmental or para-statal position (articles 19, 28, 29). A convict for life is also deprived of parental rights. Their children are either given to the other parent or hosted in a public structure (art. 32).

Life imprisonment
Articles 576 and 577 provide for a mandatory punishment of life imprisonment for murder committed under the following circumstances: 
 To commit another crime, or to escape, of favor, or take advantage from another crime (art.61, sect.2)
 Against a next of kin (parent or child) and either through insidious means, with premeditation, cruelly, of for futile motives
 By a fugitive to escape capture, or acquire means of subsistence
 While raping or sexually assaulting a person (articles 609 bis, 609 quater, 609 octies)
 By a stalker against the victim of stalking
 Against a police officer engaged in enforcing the law
 In a cruel way or through the use of torture (art.61, sect.1)
 For abject or futile motives (art.61, sect.4);
 Against a next of kin (parent or child)
 Through insidious means
 With premeditation
Cases 1 through 4 (art. 576) had been considered capital murder, and therefore punishable by death by firing squad. Since 1946, though, death penalty was discontinued in Italy, and death was substituted with life imprisonment. Italian law also uses  the felony murder rule for various violent crimes, which also provides for a mandatory life sentence. Sentences of life imprisonment are subject to parole or probation. A person that is serving a life sentence can reach libertà condizionata (conditional release) after 26 years, or after 21 years in the case of good behavior. In the most extreme cases, courts can deny the prisoner the right to conditional release and thus order them to spend the rest of their life in prison. Italy is, along with the Netherlands and the United Kingdom, one of the several European nations that provides for life imprisonment without parole for the most serious crimes.

Other definitions
Besides the criminal murder detailed above, in Italian law the following cases also exist:

See also
List of murder laws by country

References

Murder in Italy
Italy
Italian criminal law